Chalmette High School is a public secondary school in the unincorporated Chalmette area of St. Bernard Parish, Louisiana, United States. It is a part of St. Bernard Parish Public Schools.

History 

The history of Chalmette High School began in 1926 with the addition of a freshman class to Meraux Elementary School. An additional grade level was added each of three subsequent years until a four-year institution could be established. Prior to 1926, any student wanting a high school diploma had to transfer to an Orleans Parish Public School. Orleans Parish agreed to educate any secondary student from St. Bernard for a nominal annual fee paid by St. Bernard Parish School Board.

The first high school in St. Bernard Parish was named Joseph Maumas High School and was located on Friscoville Street in Old Arabi. In 1947, with the construction of a new high school building in Arabi, the name became Arabi High School. The school acquired its nickname from an owl figurine that hung above the school entrance. 

In 1954, Arabi High School changed its name to Chalmette Senior High School as it moved to the site of the current Chalmette Elementary School. A new facility was constructed at the corner of Goodchildren (which later became East Judge Perez) and Palmisano, and Chalmette Senior High moved there in 1962.

In the fall of 1966, Chalmette High School became an all-boys high school. This helped meet the demand of more classrooms to house the school population. The solution to the problem of having four co-ed high schools was to segregate by sex. This would cut costs drastically since the parish would only have to build and maintain two stadiums instead of four. Andrew Jackson High School and PGT Beauregard High School served girls for the next 22 years, and they became the "sister" schools to Chalmette and St. Bernard respectively.

During the 1968–1969 term, the school's name was officially changed to Chalmette High School.

In 1970, the Owls joined the New Orleans Catholic League, in the LHSAA's new class 4A. Wayne Warner became the principal in 1973. 

In 1971, an addition was built. Chalmette left the Catholic League football district after the 1988 season.

After Katrina 

In 2005, the parish was devastated by Hurricane Katrina. The St. Bernard Parish Public Schools opened a school in trailers set up in the stadium parking lot in November 2005. Chalmette High School played temporarily under the St. Bernard Unified School banner in its sports. By the springtime, the main building on Judge Perez had been repaired. With FEMA funding, Chalmette High School was rebuilt after the storm.

As St. Bernard Parish started to repopulate, Chalmette High School joined LHSAA class 5A for the first time in its history for the 2007 football season, and rejoined the Catholic League. The freshman academy is now located across Judge Perez at the former Lacoste Elementary. Motorola provided $50,000 to rebuild technology infrastructure in 2008, before the scheduled new campus was to open in 2009. 

In 2009, U.S. News magazine released its rankings of the best high schools in America, based on test scores and other factors. Chalmette earned a bronze medal as one of 39 schools in Louisiana to make the list. Chalmette High received an "A" rating in 2020-2021 from the state of Louisiana.

Athletic facilities have been renovated. In 2015, a new school library and administrative offices were completed.

Demographics
By 2019, the numbers of minorities had increased as a result of post-Hurricane Katrina population shifts. Audra Burch of The New York Times wrote, "The rebuilding brought more diversity, and today, of the 1,972 students at Chalmette High, about 52 percent are students of color. Minorities continued to represent 52.7% of the student population in the 2021-2022 school Year.

Athletics
Chalmette High athletics competes in Class 5A of the LHSAA.

Athletics history
The school has never won a state championship in school history. The Owls have bounced between districts in their history, with their longest stay in one district being from 1970–1989, in the famed New Orleans Catholic League Chalmette left the Catholic League in 1989, then returned from 2007-11.

Due to the closure of St. Bernard and Andrew Jackson High Schools and the re-locations of Archbishop Hannan and Holy Cross, Chalmette became the only High School in St. Bernard Parish, thus moving the school to class 5A, the highest classification of the LHSAA, for the first time in 2007.

In 2013, the Owls joined district 8-5A consisting of mostly Jefferson Parish Public Schools.

Notable alumni
Walter Boasso, former state senator
Mitchell Robinson, NBA player
Norris Weese, NFL player

Film location 
The Chalmette High School gymnasium was a setting for the 2006 film, Glory Road.

See also
 St. Bernard Parish Public Schools

References

External links

St. Bernard Parish Public Schools Home Page
U.S. News Best High Schools Bronze Medal ranking

Public high schools in Louisiana
Educational institutions established in 1926
Schools in St. Bernard Parish, Louisiana
1926 establishments in Louisiana